The Rwanda Premier League is the highest division of football in Rwanda. The league was formed in 1975. It was known as the Primus National Football League in 2004 and from 2009–10 to 2012–13, after which sponsorship was taken over by Turbo King. The league was renamed the Azam Rwanda Premier League for the 2015–16 season after Tanzanian television broadcasters Azam TV were announced as sponsors in a deal worth US$ 2.35 million covering five years.
From 2019/the 2020 season Azam TV announced the termination of its contract with Rwanda FA.

Clubs for the 2021–22 season
Étoile de l'Est and Gicumbi FC were promoted from the Second Division, while AS Muhanga and Sunrise FC were relegated from the Premier League

Previous champions

1969 : Kiyovu Sports (Kigali)
1971 : Kiyovu Sports (Kigali)
1975 : Rayon Sports (Nyanza) 
1976–79 : unknown 
1980 : Panthères Noires (Kigali)
1981 : Rayon Sports (Nyanza)
1982 : no championship
1983 : Kiyovu Sports (Kigali)
1984 : Panthères Noires (Kigali)
1985 : Panthères Noires (Kigali)
1986 : Panthères Noires (Kigali)
1987 : Panthères Noires (Kigali)
1988 : Mukungwa (Ruhengeri)
1989 : Mukungwa (Ruhengeri)
1990–91 : no championship
1992 : Kiyovu Sports (Kigali)
1993 : Kiyovu Sports (Kigali)
1994–95 : APR (Kigali)
1996 : APR (Kigali)
1997 : Rayon Sports (Nyanza)
1998 : Rayon Sports (Nyanza)
1999 : APR (Kigali)
2000 : APR (Kigali)
2001 : APR (Kigali)
2002 : Rayon Sports (Nyanza)
2003 : APR (Kigali)
2004 : Rayon Sports (Nyanza) 
2005 : APR (Kigali)
2006 : APR (Kigali)
2006–07 : APR (Kigali)
2007–08 : ATRACO (Kigali)
2008–09 : APR (Kigali)
2009–10 : APR (Kigali)
2010–11 : APR (Kigali)
2011–12 : APR (Kigali)
2012–13 : Rayon Sports (Nyanza)
2013–14 : APR (Kigali)
2014–15 : APR (Kigali)
2015–16 : APR (Kigali)
2016–17 : Rayon Sports (Nyanza)
2017–18 : APR (Kigali)
2018–19 : Rayon Sports (Nyanza)
2019–20 : APR (Kigali)
2020–21 : APR (Kigali)
2021–22 : APR (Kigali)

Performance by club

Topscorers

References

External links
League at fifa.com
RSSSF competition history

 
1
Rwanda